Watkins-Maxey House, also known as Hebrew Day School, was a historic home located at Scranton, Lackawanna County, Pennsylvania. It was built in 1895, and was a Renaissance Revival style dwelling.

It was added to the National Register of Historic Places in 1980.  It was delisted in 1986, after being demolished.

References

Houses on the National Register of Historic Places in Pennsylvania
Houses completed in 1895
Buildings and structures in Scranton, Pennsylvania
Houses in Lackawanna County, Pennsylvania
National Register of Historic Places in Lackawanna County, Pennsylvania